The flag of the U.S. state of Maine from 1901 to 1909 was the first official flag to be used to represent the state other than its militia; it was later replaced by a more standard military-style flag in 1909. The flag has recently seen a revival of interest due to local Maine vexillologists advocating for its re-adoption and businesses selling reproductions of it. There is a movement to have Maine readopt this flag design.

Design
Although the official pattern for "Embroidered or Painted Bunting" was published by the Legislature, the 1901 legislative document simply states “buff charged with the emblem of the State, a pine tree proper in the center and the polar star (a mullet of five points), in blue in the upper corner.” As long as this criterion is met, the flag should be considered a Maine state flag. Some flags today might have stylized pine trees or various shades of “buff” (beige). The pine tree is a traditional symbol of New England and has been featured on New England flags since at least 1686, notably the Pine Tree Flag, although the White Pine as a symbol probably is derived from Native American usage going back to the Iroquois Tree of the Great Peace which was first used more than 800 years ago.

A modern popular version of the flag uses a tree design from the Maine merchant and marine flag.

History

Although Maine had a semi-official militia flag from the 1820s to at least the 1860s, an official design was first proposed at the time the State House was being enlarged.

On March 6, 1901, An act to establish a State Flag was read in the State House of Representatives and referred to the Military Affairs Committee. It was read the next day in the State Senate and also referred to Military Affairs. The first draft of this act reads as follows:

The Military Affairs Committee read their report on this act in the House on March 15 and in the Senate on March 19; this report contained a new draft and was read by Frederick Walls of Vinalhaven (born North Searsmont, Me., 1844; died Vinalhaven, March 15, 1921, son of Jacob Walls and Eliza Thompson) with the recommendation, ought to pass. The new draft reads as follows:

This act passed both houses and on March 21, 1901 was Engrossed – Chapter 233 – State Law.

The flag, a simple combination of a buff ground bearing a Pine Tree in the center and a blue star in the canton, was the creation of Adjutant General John T. Richards. In its 26 March 1901 edition, on page 5, The Kennebec Journal reported that “He did not word the description according to the terms used in heraldry because they might be blind to many who are not familiar with them, but the bill in simple comprehensive language set forth General Richards’ design.”

The paper went on to explain “The design as adopted is preferable in many aspects to the State coat-of-arms ... Maine is everywhere known as ‘The Pine Tree State’ and what could be more appropriate than ... the tree should be one of the features of the flag? ... Were a flag bearing the pine tree carried through any city the people would say ‘There is Maine’.”

“Besides being the most appropriate in design, the State flag will be a thing of beauty. The background of buff, the old colonial color, will harmonize perfectly with the green of the tree and the blue pole star and altogether will form a beautiful emblem most fitting in appearance and sentiment to be the standard of the old State of Maine.”

The design was also used by the militia both as a military flag and as the design for the buttons of the new uniforms. The Maine Railroad Company, known as “The Pine Tree Line”, also used a variant on its conductors' uniform buttons. The design was also used by the people of Maine in various capacities, such as at the "Old Home Week" celebrations in 1901 and later and in various cities such as Boston and New York that had active Maine State Clubs. The State of Maine launch "Sea Gull" reportedly used it as a jack in 1904. Even as the Maine Legislature decided to change the flag in 1909, it was proudly displayed by the Hon. F.E. Timberlake at his Rangeley "camp", Marsquamosy Lodge.

Only one existing contemporary example of the 1901 flag is known to exist today. It is a small silk flag made about 1908 by the A. Kimball Co. of New York, likely for the Alaska Yukon Pacific Exposition, which was held in 1909. There are three known copies of this flag, one each in California, Maryland, and Maine.

A new law was later enacted on February 23, 1909, modeled on the first draft and supposedly after flags used in the Civil War, which revised the original:

The 1909 flag is described in minute detail, including specific size, embroidery in silk, pole, spearhead, fringe, cord and tassel; there are no flags known to exist that meet these legal descriptions. The supposed model flag in the Adjutant General's office is made of printed synthetic materials and is mounted on a pole shorter than nine feet and includes purple trees in the forest behind the white pine and moose.

To be clear, the suggestion that this flag was the same as flags used during the Civil War, an argument used to support the change, is not entirely true. Like all other Union States, Maine regiments used different flags 1861-1865. When the War started in 1861, existing Maine Militia units were mobilized and engaged using the 1822 pattern State Militia Colors. The report of Colonel J.B. Kershaw, commanding the 2nd South Carolina Infantry, dated 27 July 1861, reads:

    "Among the trophies taken by my regiment was the flag of the First Regiment, Second Brigade, Fourth Division, of the State of Maine, with its proud motto, "Dirgo", and a small Federal ensign."  (O.R., Series I, Vol. 2, p. 527).

The "Register of Captured Flags, 1861-65", compiled by the War Department during and immediately after the Civil War included a list of 263 Union recaptured flags that were found among the C.S. War Department archives, with dispositions provided for most.   Of the Union recapture list, No. 219 of the register was described as such:

    "No. 219 Regimental flag of the 1st Regiment Maine Infantry, 2nd Brigade, 4th Division.  no history."

It was returned to Maine 31 March 1905 but its present whereabouts is unknown. This flag is certainly one of the 1822 pattern colors.

The flags that were issued by the State of Maine 1861-1863 mostly were blue with the State Arms either on both sides or on one side. As each was individually painted by different painters, there was considerable variation. The 5th Maine Volunteer Infantry Color, for example, bore the Maine Arms on the obverse and the U.S. Eagle on the reverse, a not uncommon design of the day. 

By 1863, however, regiments were drawing their arms and equipment from the Federal Government rather than the State and those flags were blue with the U.S. Eagle on both sides. The famous flag of the 20th Maine Volunteer Infantry used at Gettysburg was of this design.

Recent usage

In both 1991 and 1997, David B. Martucci of Washington, Maine advocated for proposed legislation, brought forward by his representatives in the Maine Legislature, to revert to the 1901 flag, arguing that it was a simpler, more representative design of Maine as the "Pine Tree State" and was unlike any other current U.S. state flag. In both 1991 and 1997 the proposal failed, receiving 0 and 1 votes respectively.

Local Maine businesses have also begun advocating for the return of the 1901 Maine flag. In 2008, CRW Flags in Glen Burnie, Maryland began offering an exact copy of the only known existing flag from the 1900s. In 2017, the Maine Flag Company  began producing an appliqué version of the original Maine flag in their studio in Portland. As the original flag began to gain more visibility through 2018, Maine Stitching Specialties of Skowhegan, and the Bath Flag Company of Bath, all in Maine, began selling their respective variant of the original Maine flag. Rather than doing a full redesign, Flags For Good sells a version of the flag as part of their "Better State Flag" series. In addition, the Gettysburg Flag Works of East Greenbush, New York sells a version of the design.

Some of these and other firms sell clothing, hats, stickers, patches, beverage coolers, and other items bearing the flag or its elements.

Thanks to these manufacturers, the 1901 Maine flag is undergoing a surge in popularity.

A legislative bill was submitted in 2019 to change the state's official flag to one more resembling the original. After an initial wave of support, the bill died in committee due to a larger outcry over changing the flag.

On 3 February 2021, the State and Local Government Committee of the Maine Legislature considered LD 115 An Act To Restore the Former State of Maine Flag sponsored by Representative Sean Paulhus, and took testimony from 13 individuals, including Rep. Paulhus. All but one supported the bill; Secretary of State Shenna Bellows testified neither in favor nor in opposition to the bill. On 10 February 2021, the committee voted out a Divided Report. Subsequently, the Maine Legislature defeated the proposal.

See also

Symbols of the State of Maine

References

Symbols of Maine
Maine 1901
Maine 1901
Historical flags